Dengka is a Central Malayo-Polynesian language of Roti Island, off Timor, Indonesia.

References

Timor–Babar languages
Languages of Indonesia